Diane Matheson (born 27 September 1936) is a Canadian sprinter. She competed in the women's 100 metres at the 1956 Summer Olympics. At the 1958 British Empire and Commonwealth Games, she won a bronze medal in the 4×110 yard relay event alongside Eleanor Haslam, Maureen Rever, and Freyda Berman.

References

External links
 

1936 births
Living people
Athletes (track and field) at the 1956 Summer Olympics
Athletes (track and field) at the 1958 British Empire and Commonwealth Games
Canadian female sprinters
Olympic track and field athletes of Canada
Commonwealth Games bronze medallists for Canada
Commonwealth Games medallists in athletics
Sportspeople from Moncton
Olympic female sprinters
Medallists at the 1958 British Empire and Commonwealth Games